Bathurst is a subway station on Line 2 Bloor–Danforth in Toronto, Ontario, Canada.  The station, which opened in 1966, is located on Bathurst Street just north of Bloor Street West. It is a major transfer point for both bus and streetcar routes, including the 511 Bathurst route, which provides services to Exhibition Place.

Wi-Fi service is available at this station. The main entrance at Bathurst and Bloor, where the ticket collectors and turnstiles are located, is in the station building at the surface, which puts the station's streetcar and bus platforms within the fare paid zone. The opening of elevators in January 2000 made the station fully accessible. The elevators provide access between the eastbound platform and concourse, and between the westbound platform and street level via the concourse. There is regular stairway and escalator connections between all levels.  There is also a secondary unstaffed entrance on Markham street just north of Bloor street, which leads directly to the subway platform.

On August 4, 2020, the Photo ID Centre at Sherbourne station was permanently closed and relocated to Bathurst station on the concourse level.

Destinations
The station serves The Annex and Koreatown neighbourhoods. Nearby destinations include St. Peter's Roman Catholic Church, Bathurst Street Theatre, Hot Docs Ted Rogers Cinema (formerly The Bloor Hot Docs Cinema), Lee's Palace, Central Technical School and Harbord Collegiate Institute.

Surface connections

When the subway is closed, buses and streetcars do not enter the station. An on-street transfer is required at Bathurst Street and Bloor Street during this time. TTC routes serving the station include:

Tributes to Honest Ed's

In November 2016, the Honest Ed's style signs and slogans were decorated in this station to commemorate the impact of Honest Ed's landmark discount store on the community. This temporary tribute remained on display until just after Honest Ed's closing on December 31, 2016. Temporary signs hand-painted in the familiar Honest Ed's style welcomed customers at street level, and the windows were decorated with the TTC's unique take on Ed's famous punny signs. In addition to this unique tribute, the TTC's November 2016 Metropass featured Honest Ed's famous sign.

The TTC later installed a permanent tribute to Honest Ed's on the concourse level in a passage leading to the streetcar/bus platforms. This tribute consists of five vertical panels and a mural. The panels show photos, store signs and other memorabilia associated with the former department store. The mural, on the wall opposite to the panels, is a realistic, life-size image of the vault door that was on the north side of Honest Ed's. The trompe-l'œil image makes the door's hardware look 3-dimensional. There are two smaller images of the vault door on one of the five panels.

Parkette

The piece of land between the main station building and Bathurst Street, encircled by the streetcar loop tracks, is used by the City of Toronto as a public park. Previously named "Bathurst Subway Parkette", a ceremony took place on September 22, 2008 to rename the park "Ed & Anne Mirvish Parkette". Ed Mirvish had been a well known local businessman whose landmark Honest Ed's discount store was located nearby at the southwest corner of Bloor Street and Bathurst Street. The Mirvish family had requested an appropriate commemoration to Ed, who had died on July 11, 2007 and the City of Toronto Parks, Forestry and Recreation Division recommended the renaming of this parkette as an opportunity to honour Ed and his wife Anne, who were both a positive influence on the community.

References

External links

Line 2 Bloor–Danforth stations
Toronto streetcar loops
Railway stations in Canada opened in 1966
Pocket parks